The Tuolumne Intrusive Suite is one of several intrusive suites in Yosemite National Park. These also include

 Fine Gold Intrusive Suite
 Intrusive Suite of Buena Vista Crest
 Intrusive Suite of Jack Main Canyon
 Intrusive Suite of Merced Peak
 Intrusive Suite of Sonora Pass
 Intrusive Suite of Yosemite Valley

The age and composition of the Tuolumne Intrusive Suite
The Tuolumne Intrusive Suite is the youngest and most extensive of the intrusive suites of Yosemite National Park, and also comprises about 1/3 of the park's area, is the most extensive intrusive suite in the Park. It contains rock types including Half Dome Granodiorite and Cathedral Peak Granite, also, Kuna Crest Granodiorite. Oldest to youngest rocks are

 Kuna Crest Granodiorite, 
 Half Dome Granodiorite,
 Cathedral Peak Granodiorite (which is about 86 million years old), to
 Johnson Granite Porphyry.

The youngest, smallest, and most central rock body is of the Johnson Granite Porphyry, a variety of porphyry.

The southwestern part of the Tuolumne Intrusive Suite is made up of Half Dome Granodiorite.

The Tuolumne Intrusive Suite and Cathedral Peak Granodiorite

The largest pluton of the Tuolumne Intrusive Suite is Cathedral Peak Granodiorite, which extends long distances both the north and south of Tuolumne Meadows.

See also

 Kuna Crest
 Kuna Peak

References

External links and references

 Roadside geology, in Tuolumne Meadows, with the Tuolumne Intrusive Suite

Geology of California
Geology of Yosemite National Park